Starý Smokovec railway station is a junction station in the High Tatras. It serves the ski, tourist and health resort of Starý Smokovec, in the Prešov Region, northeastern Slovakia.

Opened in 1908, the station is the focal point of the metre gauge Tatra Electric Railway (TEŽ). It forms the junction between the TEŽ's Poprad-Tatry–Štrbské Pleso main line and its only other line, the Starý Smokovec–Tatranská Lomnica branch.

The station is currently owned by Železnice Slovenskej republiky (ŽSR); train services are operated by Železničná spoločnosť Slovensko (ZSSK).

Location

Starý Smokovec railway station is right in the heart of Starý Smokovec, which forms part of the town of Vysoké Tatry, a conglomerate of separate and different settlements (originally separate villages). The only common feature of the Vysoké Tatry settlements is that they are the main tourist resorts in the Slovak High Tatras, connected through a common railway network, the TEŽ. After the country's capital, Vysoké Tatry is Slovakia's major tourist destination.

History

On 16 December 1911, Starý Smokovec became a temporary switchback station, with the opening of the  branch between Starý Smokovec and Tatranská Lomnica.

The station was finally transformed into a junction station on 13 August 1912, when the rest of the TEŽ's main line was completed between Starý Smokovec and Štrbské Pleso.

Facilities
The station building is an attractive three-storey building of half timbered design. It houses information and ticketing facilities, and a restaurant.

Train services
Starý Smokovec railway station is the junction of the following High Tatras railway lines:

 Line : Poprad-Tatry–Štrbské Pleso (the TEŽ's main line)
 Line : Starý Smokovec–Tatranská Lomnica

Interchange
The station offers interchange with local buses.

Services

See also

History of rail transport in Slovakia
Rail transport in Slovakia

References

Notes

Books

External links

 Starý Smokovec railway station on vlaky.net 

Railway stations in Prešov Region
Railway stations opened in 1908
1908 establishments in Austria-Hungary
Railway stations in Slovakia opened in the 20th century